James D. Maxwell II (born May 4, 1975) is an associate justice of the Supreme Court of Mississippi.

Biography 

Maxwell earned his Bachelor of Arts and Juris Doctor from the University of Mississippi. He practiced civil law in Jackson in the firm of Daniel Coker Horton & Bell before returning to Oxford to serve as an Assistant United States Attorney for the Northern District of Mississippi in 2002.

Service on Mississippi Court of Appeals 
He served as a judge on the Mississippi Court of Appeals. He was initially appointed to the appeals court by Governor Haley Barbour on February 2, 2009, then elected in 2010 and re-elected in 2014.

Service on the Supreme Court of Mississippi 
On December 23, 2015, Governor Phil Bryant announced his appointment of Maxwell to the Supreme Court.

In January 2020, Maxwell upheld the 12-year conviction of Willie Nash, an African American man, for having a cell phone while in jail. Nash was booked into Newton County Jail in Decatur, Mississippi. Jail officials failed to confiscate Nash's cell phone in the booking process, so he was unaware that he was not allowed to have one. His phone was seized when he asked a jail official for a charger. Nash was using the cell phone to text his wife. In August 2018, the judge handed him a 12-year sentence. On review, Maxwell wrote, "While obviously harsh, Nash's twelve-year sentence for possessing a cell phone in a correctional facility is not grossly disproportionate."

Awards and recognition 
He is a past president of the Young Lawyers Division of the Mississippi Bar Association, the Lafayette County Bar Association, and Tri-County Young Lawyers. He has also served on the Board of Bar Commissioners, the Mississippi Bar Foundation, the Diversity in the Law Committee, and the Board of Directors of the Mississippi Prosecutors Association. He is a graduate of Mississippi Economic Council's Leadership Mississippi program and in 2007 was named "Top 40 Under 40" by the Mississippi Business Journal.

Personal life 
Maxwell is married to his wife Mindy and they have two children, Trip and Mae Covington. They are members of First Baptist Church of Oxford.

References

External links 
 Official Biography on Supreme Court website
 

1975 births
Living people
21st-century American lawyers
21st-century American judges
Assistant United States Attorneys
Baptists from Mississippi
Mississippi Court of Appeals judges
Mississippi lawyers
Justices of the Mississippi Supreme Court
University of Mississippi alumni
University of Mississippi School of Law alumni